Popchips is an American brand of popped potato and corn products marketed as similar to potato chips. They are manufactured by processing potato starch at high pressure and temperature, in a process similar to that used for puffed rice cakes.

History
Keith Belling is a co-founder and CEO of Popchips which was created in 2007. Belling teamed up with Patrick Turpin, and created a new popped chip. The company created a chip that utilizes potato and corn products that are cooked at a high pressure and temperature. Turpin co-founded Popchips, Inc., and serves as its President.

In November, 2015 David Ritterbush was named CEO of the company, replacing Paul Davis.

Recognition
The company was rated by Forbes as among America's top 20 most promising companies in 2011. Forbes also reported that investors in the company included Ashton Kutcher, David Ortiz, Jillian Michaels, and Sean Combs.

Ashton Kutcher controversy
Popchips received widespread criticism for their May 2012 video ad campaign featuring actor Ashton Kutcher. The campaign featured Kutcher as an Indian man 'looking for love' in a dating ad-style spoof. Kutcher's use of brown-face make up and a stereotypical Indian accent was deemed racially insensitive and offensive and received backlash from online viewers and members of the Indian-American community.

Celebrities
Ashton Kutcher was the first celebrity to endorse the company, with 13 million followers on Twitter. Kutcher boosted the publicity of Popchips. In 2012, Popchips also gained another celebrity endorser, Katy Perry. Since 2012, Perry featured in advertisements and also helped to launch her own flavor of Popchips, Katy's Kettle Corn.

Awards
Since 2007, Popchips has won the following awards:
Best Crispy Snack for Kids - IVillage 
Best Snack - Shape (magazine)
Best Potato Chip - Men's Health (magazine)
Outstanding Snack - sofi Awards
Best Chips - Real Simple (magazine)
Best Chips Under 100 Calories - Eat This, Not That (magazine)
One of the 8 Most Addicting Foods - Yahoo! Shine
Best Low Calorie Snack - Good Housekeeping (magazine)
Best Chips - Slash Food
Best Crunchy Snack - Fitness (magazine)
 #1 Potato Chip - Kiwi (magazine)
Best Chips - Health (magazine)

Distribution
Popchips provides its snack through a network of retail stores including Target, Safeway, and Walgreens in the United States, Canada, United Kingdom, Ireland and also online.

Products
Popchips are produced in a number of flavors in addition to the original flavor:

Potato

Sea Salt
Sour Cream & Onion
Barbeque
Sea Salt & Vinegar
Thai Sweet Chilli
Mature Cheddar & Onion
Potato Ridges
Crazy Hot
Buffalo Ranch
Cheddar and Sour Cream

Nutritional Information
 A share size bag of potato popchips (3 oz.) contain 120 calories per serving size (1 oz.). 
 A share size bag of tortilla popchips (3.5 oz.) contain 120 calories per serving size (1 oz.). 
 A share size bag of Katy's Kettle Corn popchips (3.5 oz.) contain 130 calories per serving size (1 oz.).

References

External links
 popchips company website

Brand name snack foods
Brand name potato chips and crisps
British snack foods